Elbernita "Twinkie" Clark (born November 15, 1954) is an American gospel singer, songwriter, composer, record producer, musician, and evangelist. Clark is best known as a member of the American gospel singing group the Clark Sisters. Clark is known as the "Mother of Contemporary Gospel Music". In addition to singing, Clark is a heralded musician. Known as the "Queen of the B3 Hammond Organ", she is a member of the Hammond organ Hall of Fame Class of 2014. In 2012, Clark was honored by Dr. Judith Christie McAllister and the International Music Department of the Church of God in Christ, as a living legend and influencer during the 105th International Holy Convocation, where Clark also received an honorary doctorate of sacred music from Dr. Tony Lewis and the Christian Bible Institute and Seminary (CBIS).

Biography

Early life
Born to pioneering gospel musician and choral director Dr. Mattie Moss Clark and Pastor Elbert Clark in Detroit, Michigan, Clark began her tutelage in music under the direction of her mother, very early in life. From the age of thirteen, she began touring nationally with her mother, ministering and training choirs in three-part vocal harmony. In 1967, she made her recording debut as a featured vocalist alongside her mother, sister Denise Clark, and Dolores Jones on the Southwest Michigan State Choir of the Church Of God in Christ's "He Will Supply Your Need", from the album A Closer Walk with Thee. Clark later received formal music education at Howard University in Washington, D.C.

The Clark Sisters 

Since their formation in 1973, Clark has been the leader, principal songwriter, and producer of the gospel group the Clark Sisters, which includes sisters Jacky Clark Chisholm, Dorinda Clark Cole, and Karen Clark Sheard (sister Denise Clark Bradford departed the group in 1986). The group achieved their biggest success with the mainstream, crossover hit "You Brought the Sunshine (Into My Life)" in 1983, which peaked within the top 20 of Billboards Gospel and Hot R&B/Hip-Hop Songs charts and hit a top 30 peak on the Hot Dance Club Play chart. Other hit songs include, "Is My Living in Vain", "Expect Your Miracle" and "Jesus is a Love Song", all written by Clark. Receiving their first Grammy nomination at the 26th Annual Grammy Awards for Sincerely (1982) in the Best Soul Gospel Performance by a Duo or Group category, they received subsequent nominations for their follow-ups, Heart & Soul (1986) and Conqueror (1988), for Best Soul Gospel Performance by a Duo, Group, Choir or Chorus at the 30th and 31st Annual Grammy Awards. In 1990, the group received its first Grammy nomination for a live album when Bringing it Back Home (1989) was nominated for Best Traditional Soul Gospel Album at the 33rd Annual Grammy Awards. In 2007, the Clark Sisters were awarded three Grammys at the 50th Annual Grammy Awards: Best Gospel Song and Best Gospel Performance for "Blessed & Highly Favored" and Best Traditional Gospel Album for its parent album Live: One Last Time, which topped both the Billboard Gospel Albums and Christian Music Video charts.

In 2016, the group was honored at the Essence festival. In 2020, it was announced that the Clark Sisters would be honored with the James Cleveland Lifetime Achievement Award at the 35th Annual Stellar Awards. The same year, a Lifetime biographical film, The Clark Sisters: First Ladies of Gospel was released, produced by Queen Latifah, Mary J. Blige, and Missy Elliott, and became the highest rated original movie release by Lifetime in four years.

Solo career
Clark has recorded several solo albums. Her debut studio album, Praise Belongs to God (1979), was ranked at No. 28 by Billboard on the 1981 year-end Spiritual Albums chart and followed shortly by Ye Shall Receive Power (1981). In 1992, she released Comin' Home and The Masterpiece in 1996. Also in 1996, she made her live solo debut in a collaborative album Twinkie Clark-Terrell Presents the Florida A&M University Gospel Choir, which was a top 10 hit on the Billboard Gospel Albums chart, where it was placed by Billboard as the 34th Top Gospel Album of 1996. In 2002, she released Twinkie Clark & Friends...Live in Charlotte which received a Grammy nomination for Best Traditional Soul Gospel Album. In 2004, it was followed by the Asaph Ward-produced Home Once Again: Live in Detroit, which became her highest charting album on Billboards Gospel Albums chart and also appeared on the Top R&B/Hip-Hop Albums chart. In 2011 and 2013, Clark released With Humility and Live & Unplugged respectively on Larry Clark Gospel, before releasing a collaborative album with Larry Clark (the son of her sister Denise Clark Bradford), The Generations in 2020.

Musical influence
Clark has been inspired by different genres of music, including jazz, reggae, classical, funk, and blues, and she lists artists such as Stevie Wonder, Walter Hawkins, Edwin Hawkins, Andraé Crouch, Charles Nicks, and her mother, Mattie Moss Clark, as musical influences. This is evidenced by listening to her first two solo albums Praise Belongs to God and Ye Shall Receive Power, recorded for Sound of Gospel Records while still with The Clark Sisters.

Discography

Studio albums

EPs

Live albums

Compilation albums

Singles
as a lead artist

as a featured artist

Album appearances

Awards

BET Awards
The BET Awards are awarded annually by the Black Entertainment Television network. Clark has received two nominations.

Dove Awards
The Dove Awards are awarded annually by the Gospel Music Association. Clark has won two awards from eight nominations.

Grammy Awards
The Grammy Awards are awarded annually by the National Academy of Recording Arts and Sciences. Clark has won two awards from eight nominations.

NAACP Image Awards
The NAACP Image Awards are awarded annually by the National Association for the Advancement of Colored People (NAACP). Clark has won two awards from four nominations.

Soul Train Awards
The Soul Train Music Awards are awarded annually. Clark has received three nominations.

Stellar Awards
The Stellar Awards are awarded annually by SAGMA. Clark has received 8 awards and 1 honorary award.

Notes

References

External links

Organ Music Workshop – The Gospel According to Twinkie

African-American women singer-songwriters
American gospel singers
American organists
Women organists
Singers from Detroit
Howard University alumni
1954 births
20th-century American singers
21st-century American singers
Living people
African-American Christians
American Pentecostals
Members of the Church of God in Christ
21st-century American women singers
20th-century American women singers
21st-century organists
20th-century American keyboardists
Singer-songwriters from Michigan